This is a list of members of the European Parliament for France in the 2019 to 2024 session.

Partisan distribution 
Five MEPs were formally considered to have been elected in the elections, but did not take their seats until the departure of the United Kingdom from the European Union on 31 January 2020. They included Jean-Lin Lacapelle (RN), Sandro Gozi (IV), Ilana Cicurel (LREM), Claude Gruffat (SE), and Nora Mebarek (PS).

List of members of the European Parliament 

 Max Orville (since May 2022)
 Marina Mesure (since July 2022)
 Marie Dauchy (since July 2022)
 Éric Minardi (since July 2022)

References

External links 

2019
Lists of Members of the European Parliament 2019–2024
MEPs for France 2019–2024